Underground is a novel by Australian author Andrew McGahan. It is set in a near-future right-wing governed Australia.

Reception
A review of Underground in The Sydney Morning Herald called it "McGahan's most nakedly political work so far, positioning itself as a comment on the "war on terror" generally and a broadside against the Howard Government in particular." that it "suffers from a fatal equivocation: it is neither hilarious nor penetrating enough." and "The bombastic action and outrageous twists of fate (Leo is kidnapped three times, by three separate groups, in the first 50 pages) does not allow for the analysis that might have given the novel authority."

Underground has also been reviewed by Australian Quarterly, The Bulletin, Antipodes, and Overland.

Awards
International Dublin Literary Award, 2008: longlisted
Australian Book Industry Awards (ABIA), Australian Literary Fiction Book of the Year, 2007: shortlisted
Queensland Premier's Literary Awards, Best Fiction Book, 2007: shortlisted
Aurealis Awards for Excellence in Australian Speculative Fiction, Science Fiction Division, Novel, 2006: shortlisted
FAW Christina Stead Award, 2006: highly commended

References

External links 
Library holdings of Underground

2006 Australian novels
Australian science fiction novels
2006 science fiction novels
Novels set in Australia